Brisbane (pron.  ) is a small city in San Mateo County, California, located on the lower slopes of the San Bruno Mountain. The city is on the northeastern edge of San Mateo County, located immediately south of the San Francisco city limits on the San Francisco Bay. The population was 4,851 as of the 2020 census.

Brisbane is called "The City of Stars" because of a holiday tradition dating back to 1939. Many of the stars are kept up all year.

Geography
A remnant of San Francisco Bay, the Lagoon was formed by the construction of the U. S. Highway 101 causeway, and became diminished as most of its north and central portions were filled with landfill. Brisbane sits at the southeast corner of the Guadalupe Valley.

Guadalupe Valley Creek is a small creek which flows east through Brisbane along the north flank of San Bruno Mountain and enters the Brisbane Lagoon after passing under the Tunnel Avenue bridge.

History

The first recorded inhabitants were the Costanoan Indians. They built dome-shaped dwellings of boughs and tules. By 1776, Spanish explorers had arrived and the Franciscan missionaries soon followed leaving numerous large land grants in their wake. With Mexican rule, the lands controlled by the Mission were released to private enterprise.

Brisbane was originally part of Rancho Cañada de Guadalupe la Visitación y Rodeo Viejo, a large tract of land that included the Cañada de Guadalupe (now Guadalupe Valley), and also the Bayshore district of Daly City, the Visitacion Valley district of San Francisco, and San Bruno Mountain. Visitacion City, as it was initially known, was platted in 1908 adjacent to a new rail line that had been completed in 1907 to the east of the town site. The Southern Pacific Railroad built the new line to create a faster and more direct route into San Francisco. The railroad also planned to build extensive terminal facilities just north of the town site.  The Visitacion Valley rail yard and locomotive works were expected to employ over 1,000 workers, but construction was halted soon after it began due to the Panic of 1907. The town site remained largely undeveloped for many years.  The railroad resumed construction of the yard and shops during World War I, and the facilities were completed by 1918.

The city is served by San Mateo County Libraries.

In the 1920s Arthur Annis proposed the name change from Visitacion City to Brisbane.  Annis regarded the name Visitacion City as a handicap "being so close to a San Francisco city district with a similar name", which he felt would confuse people and prevent "Brisbane" from establishing its own unique identity. Accounts of how the city acquired its name vary. According to his daughter, the city was named for Brisbane, Queensland, perhaps due to the area's resemblance to that port city at the time. Another story holds that it was named for newspaper columnist Arthur Brisbane.

Demographics

2010
The 2010 United States Census reported that Brisbane had a population of 4,282. The racial makeup of Brisbane was 2,578 (60.2%) White, 80 (1.9%) African American, 21 (0.5%) Native American, 1,084 (25.3%) Asian, 41 (1.0%) Pacific Islander, 182 (4.3%) from other races, and 296 (6.9%) from two or more races. Hispanic or Latino of any race were 712 persons (16.6%).

The Census reported that 4,266 people (99.6% of the population) lived in households, 16 (0.4%) lived in non-institutionalized group quarters, and 0 (0%) were institutionalized.

There were 1,821 households, out of which 514 (28.2%) had children under the age of 18 living in them, 808 (44.4%) were opposite-sex married couples living together, 159 (8.7%) had a female householder with no husband present, 96 (5.3%) had a male householder with no wife present.  There were 128 (7.0%) unmarried opposite-sex partnerships, and 59 (3.2%) same-sex married couples or partnerships. 554 households (30.4%) were made up of individuals, and 122 (6.7%) had someone living alone who was 65 years of age or older. The average household size was 2.34.  There were 1,063 families (58.4% of all households); the average family size was 2.94.

The population was spread out, with 825 people (19.3%) under the age of 18, 213 people (5.0%) aged 18 to 24, 1,356 people (31.7%) aged 25 to 44, 1,459 people (34.1%) aged 45 to 64, and 429 people (10.0%) who were 65 years of age or older.  The median age was 41.7 years. For every 100 females, there were 100.7 males.  For every 100 females age 18 and over, there were 99.8 males.

The homeowner vacancy rate was 1.3%; the rental vacancy rate was 5.5%.  2,936 people (68.6% of the population) lived in owner-occupied housing units and 1,330 people (31.1%) lived in rental housing units.

2000
As of the census of 2000, there were 3,597 people, 1,620 households, and 850 families residing in the city.
There were 1,620 households, out of which 23.0% had children under the age of 18 living with them, 40.2% were married couples living together, 8.1% had a female householder with no husband present, and 47.5% were non-families. 34.8% of all households were made up of individuals, and 6.3% had someone living alone who was 65 years of age or older.  The average household size was 2.20 and the average family size was 2.89.

In the city, the population was spread out, with 17.7% under the age of 18, 5.6% from 18 to 24, 37.5% from 25 to 44, 31.1% from 45 to 64, and 8.1% who were 65 years of age or older.  The median age was 40 years. For every 100 females, there were 100.8 males.  For every 100 females age 18 and over, there were 101.3 males.

The median income for a household in the city was $63,684, and the median income for a family was $81,484. Males had a median income of $51,270 versus $48,684 for females. The per capita income for the city was $37,162.  About .4% of families and .7% of the population were below the poverty line, including 3.7% of those under age 18 and 7.6% of those age 65 or over.

Government

The mayor is Karen Cunningham, and Clifford R Lentz is Mayor Pro Tempore.

According to the California Secretary of State, as of February 10, 2019, Brisbane has 2,794 registered voters. Of those, 1,455 (52.1%) are registered Democrats, 292 (10.5%) are registered Republicans, and 906 (32.4%) have declined to state a political party.

Transportation
The main arterial road serving Brisbane is Bayshore Boulevard. The boulevard continues north to San Francisco and south to South San Francisco and SFO. U.S. Route 101 also goes past the city on the eastern side adjacent to San Francisco Bay.

SamTrans provides bus service through the city along Bayshore Boulevard. Shuttles connecting to nearby BART, Muni T-Third Street line and Caltrain stations are available to residents and employees in the city.

Economy

Brisbane's economy is dominated by office parks at Sierra Point and an industrial park around the Valley Drive corridor.  There are commercial areas at Brisbane Village, Visitacion Avenue, and Bayshore Avenue. The population of Brisbane doubles during the work day as such facilities fill up with commuters.  Some of the larger office tenants in Brisbane are Cutera Inc., Dolby, Tercica, Sing Tao, and Intermune.  Monster Cable Products and bebe stores (traditionally spelled in lowercase) are headquartered in Brisbane on Valley Drive. The Sierra Point office park area is home to a number of well-known class A office buildings like the Dakin Building.

Universal Paragon's proposed  Brisbane Baylands project, if approved by Brisbane voters, proposes to more than double the existing employment base of the city by providing new office, research & development, retail, hotel and other land uses that are accessible by a proposed multi-modal transit station (Caltrain, Muni T-Third light rail and proposed Bus Rapid Transit). Houses are quite expensive, as the average home cost is around $639,000. This compared to the California average of $393,000 follows a common home price trend in the surrounding areas.

Parks and open space

Brisbane California is home to the San Bruno Mountain as well as a number of city parks.  San Bruno Mountain is known for its views of the City, and the native Mission Blue butterfly.  City parks in Brisbane include the Community Park in the center of town (1 Visitacion Ave.) the Fire Hydrant Plug Preserve (300 Mariposa St.) and Firth Park (100 Lake St.) and The Brisbane Dog Park ( 50 Park Pl.)

Top employers

According to the city's 2020 Comprehensive Annual Financial Report, the top employers in the city are:

Whale rescue

In 1989, north of Sierra Point Humphrey the whale was beached on a mudflat after an anomalous journey into the San Francisco Bay.  His rescue was filmed for national TV and witnessed by hundreds of onlookers from the upper floors of the Dakin Building.  The rescue was carried out by staff of The Marine Mammal Center and United States Coast Guard.

Education
The city is served by the Brisbane Public Library of the San Mateo County Libraries, a member of the Peninsula Library System.

References

External links

City of Brisbane
 History of Brisbane
Brisbane Baylands Project

 
Incorporated cities and towns in California
Cities in San Mateo County, California
Cities in the San Francisco Bay Area
Populated places established in 1908
1908 establishments in California
Populated coastal places in California